The structure of the government of South Dakota is based on that of the federal government, with three branches of government: executive, legislative, and judicial. The structure of the state government is laid out in the Constitution of South Dakota, the highest law in the state. The constitution may be amended either by a majority vote of both houses of the legislature, or by voter initiative.

Executive branch
The governor of South Dakota heads the executive branch of the state government. The state constitution gives the governor the power to either sign into law or veto bills passed by the state legislature, to serve as commander-in-chief of the state's armed forces, to appoint a cabinet, and to commute criminal sentences or to pardon those convicted of crimes. The governor serves for a four-year term, and may not serve more than two consecutive terms.

The current governor is Kristi Noem, a Republican from Watertown. The Lt. governor is Larry Rhoden (R), the attorney general is Marty J. Jackley (R), the commissioner of school and public lands is Brock Greenfield (R), the secretary of state is Monae Johnson (R), the state auditor is Rich Sattgast (R), and the treasurer is Josh Haeder (R).

Legislature

The state legislature is made up of two bodies, the Senate, which has 35 members, and the House of Representatives, with 70 members. South Dakota is divided into 35 legislative districts, with voters electing two representatives and one senator per district. The legislature meets for an annual session which begins on the second Tuesday in January and lasts for 40 days. it also meets if a special session is called by the governor. The Republican Party currently holds majorities in both houses of the South Dakota Legislature. Currently, the Senate consists of 30 Republicans and 5 Democrats, while the House of Representatives is made up of 59 Republicans, 11 Democrats  State law currently limits legislators to a maximum of four consecutive terms in the same house of the Legislature.

Judicial branch
The judicial branch is made up of several levels. The state supreme court, with four justices and a chief justice, is the highest court in the state. Below the supreme court are the circuit courts; 41 circuit judges serve in seven judicial circuits in the state. Below the circuit courts are the magistrate courts, which deal with more minor criminal and civil actions.

Federal representation
South Dakota is represented at the federal level by Senator Mike Rounds, Senator John Thune, and Representative Dusty Johnson.  All the federal representatives are Republicans, this hasn't been the case since 1961. South Dakota is one of seven states with only one seat in the US House of Representatives.

South Dakota is part of the United States District Court for the District of South Dakota in the federal judiciary. The district's cases are appealed to the St-Louis-based United States Court of Appeals for the Eighth Circuit.

Native government
Native Americans' governments are significantly independent of the state and its local governments. For example, federal law forbids states and local authorities to tax Indian lands.

Politics

South Dakota politics are generally dominated by the Republican Party, and the state has not supported a Democratic presidential candidate since 1964—especially notable when one considers that George McGovern, the Democratic nominee in 1972, was from South Dakota. Since statehood, it has only voted Democratic four times, in 1896, 1932, 1936, and 1964, as well as for the Progressive candidate in 1912.

There are only five reliably Democratic counties in the state—most of them with primarily Native American populations. Republicans have won the last 13 gubernatorial elections and have controlled the legislature, with one brief interruption, for over thirty years. Democrats, however, have been successful in winning election to Congress from South Dakota, including former Senators Tom Daschle, who served as Majority Leader, James Abourezk, George McGovern, and Tim Johnson; and former Representative Stephanie Herseth Sandlin.

While President Bush received a lower vote percentage in 2004 than he did in 2000, he still received a very strong 60% of the popular vote. Part of the deviation had to do with record turnout driven by the intense Senate campaigns that year. As of 2016, Republicans hold a 15% voter registration advantage over Democrats and hold large majorities in both the state House of Representatives and Senate. Additionally, all but one of the statewide elected officers are Republicans.

In the more than a quarter century between 1979 and 2005, two politicians, one a Republican and one a Democrat, dominated South Dakota politics.  Republican Governor Bill Janklow served four terms as governor from 1979-1987 and then from 1995 to 2003 followed by a brief partial term as a United States Representative from 2003-2004. Janklow's career was ended by a motor vehicle manslaughter conviction causing his resignation from Congress.  Democrat Tom Daschle was also a dominant figure in South Dakota politics, serving in Congress, 1979-2005.  He first served eight years in the United States House of Representatives and then eighteen years in the United States Senate after his senate election in 1986. Over a period of ten years, he served both as minority leader and majority leader in the Senate.  In 2004, he lost his Senate seat to a Republican, former United States Representative John Thune, who narrowly defeated Daschle by a 51%-49% margin. Daschle became the first Senate party leader in 52 years to lose re-election to his own Senate seat.

South Dakota has a history of voting out powerful members of the Senate who seek fourth terms. Former Commerce Committee Chairman Larry Pressler lost to Congressman Tim Johnson in 1996, and 1972 Democratic Presidential nominee George McGovern was defeated by Congressman James Abdnor in 1980. Abdnor was, in turn, defeated by Daschle in 1986.

Political geography

The Missouri River, bisects the state. The area east of the Missouri River (or "East River"), is generally more moderate, with views that are more in line with those found in its Midwestern neighbors, Iowa and Minnesota. "West River" is more conservative, with views that are generally more in line with those found in its western neighbors, Montana and Wyoming.  Large exceptions exist to the East River-West River political generalizations, however.  The strongest Democratic counties in the state are West River.  These counties are located within Indian Reservations.  The strongest Republican counties are located East River.  These counties were primarily settled by Protestant Germans from Russia, and be they Mennonite, Lutheran, Baptist or Reformed, they vote overwhelmingly Republican.  A large part of the western half of East River responds politically in the same fashion as West River.  Many observers think that the James River Valley really is the political dividing line between East River political thought and West River political thought.

Recent elections

2006 election
In the 2006 midterm elections, little change occurred in South Dakota in statewide elections.  The Republicans defeated the sole Democrat state officeholder previously elected statewide, but lost another statewide elected office to the Democrats. Otherwise, all federal and state officeholders were comfortably re-elected.  The Democrats made a significant gain in the state senate, narrowing the Republican margin from 25–10 to 20–15, costing the Republican legislative leadership its two-thirds majority in both houses of the legislature.

By referendum, the electorate rejected an abortion ban approved by the state legislature. 56% of the electorate voted to overturn the law, generally considered a direct challenge to Roe v. Wade. Additionally, the electorate rejected a proposed law permitting the use of marijuana for medical purposes, and narrowly approved a state constitutional amendment banning same-sex marriage.  The prevailing side received a 52%–48% margin in both cases.

2008 election
Senator Tim Johnson defeated state Sen. Joel Dykstra on November 4, 2008.  Congresswoman Stephanie Herseth Sandlin defeated Rapid City businessman Chris Lien.

2010 election
In 2010, Republican Dennis Daugaard defeated Democrat Scott Heidepriem for governor, and Republican Kristi Noem defeated incumbent Congresswoman Stephanie Herseth Sandlin for South Dakota's at-large seat in the US House of Representatives. Republican John Thune won a second term as US senator, running unopposed in 2010.

2012 election
In 2012, Noem retained her seat with 57% of the vote and the state voted for Republican nominee Mitt Romney over Democratic President Barack Obama by a margin of 18%.

2014 election
Republican Dennis Daugaard won re-election with 70.47% over Susan Wismer with 25.43%. Mike Rounds won his campaign over Rick Weiland.

Issues
As of 2005, South Dakota has the lowest per capita total state tax rate in the United States. The state does not levy personal or corporate income taxes, inheritance taxes, or taxes on intangible personal property. The state sales tax rate is 4.5 percent. Various localities have local levies so in some areas the rate is 6 percent. The state sales tax does not apply to sales to Indians on Indian reservations, but many reservations have a compact with the state. Businesses on the reservation collect the tax and the state refunds to the Indian Tribes the percentage of sales tax collections relating to the ratio of Indian population to total population in the county or area affected. Ad valorem property taxes are local taxes and are a large source of funding for school systems, counties, municipalities and other local government units. The South Dakota Special Tax Division regulates some taxes including cigarette and alcohol-related taxes.

U.S. senators

References

Further reading

External links
 

 
South Dakota